, also titled A Picture of Madame Yuki, is a 1950 Japanese drama film directed by Kenji Mizoguchi.

Plot
Yuki Shinano, a descendant of the once powerful Shinano family, is living in an unhappy marriage with her husband Naoyuki. Although he treats her disdainfully and has a candid affair with his mistress Ayako, whom he even brings to Yuki's residence in Atami, she is tied to him through sexual dependency. Yuki and koto teacher Masaya share a mutual affection since childhood, but are both too weak-willed to change the situation. In an attempt to gain autonomy, Yuki opens an inn in her residence, but Naoyuki makes Ayako the head of the business, only to find out later that he himself has been bought out by Ayako and his lawyer Tateoka. Yuki, pregnant from her husband but suspected of adultery through a scheme contrived by Tateoka, drowns herself in the lake.

Cast
 Michiyo Kogure as Yuki Shinano
 Yoshiko Kuga as Hamako Abe
 Ken Uehara as Masaya Kikunaka
 Eijirō Yanagi as Naoyuki Shinano
 Sō Yamamura as Tateoka
 Yuriko Hamada as Ayako
 Kumeko Urabe as housekeeper
 Haruya Kato as Seitaro

References

External links
 
 
 

Japanese black-and-white films
1950 films
Films directed by Kenji Mizoguchi
Films scored by Fumio Hayasaka
Films with screenplays by Yoshikata Yoda
Films based on Japanese novels
Japanese drama films
1950 drama films
Films set in Atami
1950s Japanese films